The Ryerson Fiction Award, also known as the All-Canada Prize, was a Canadian literary award, presented irregularly between 1942 and 1960. Presented by Ryerson Press, the award was given to an unpublished manuscript by a new or emerging writer, which was then published by Ryerson Press, and the prize consisted of $1,000 of which $500 was an advance on royalties.

Although it was considered one of the major Canadian literary awards in its era, few of the winning novels remain well-remembered today. Only five titles which won the award ever went on to a subsequent paperback reprint, with Edward McCourt's Music at the Close the only title that was selected for McClelland & Stewart's New Canadian Library reprint series in the 1970s.

Statistics
Two works, G. Herbert Sallans' Little Man and Philip Child's Mr. Ames Against Time, won both the Ryerson Fiction Prize and the Governor General's Award for English-language fiction in the same year; one other writer, Laura Salverson, won both awards for different works. Three writers — Child, Will R. Bird and Gladys Taylor — won the award twice, although both of Bird's wins and one of Child's were in ties with other writers.

Winners
1942 – G. Herbert Sallans, Little Man
1943 – no award
1944 – no award
1945 – (tie) Will R. Bird, Here Stays Good Yorkshire and Philip Child, Day of Wrath
1946 – no award
1947 – (tie) Edward McCourt, Music at the Close and Will R. Bird, Judgment Glen
1948 – no award
1949 – Philip Child, Mr. Ames Against Time
1950 – Jeann Beattie, Blaze of Noon
1951 – no award
1952 – no award
1953 – Evelyn M. Richardson, Desired Haven
1954 – Laura Salverson, Immortal Rock
1955 – no award
1956 – Gladys Taylor, Pine Roots
1957 – Joan Walker, Repent at Leisure
1958 – Gladys Taylor, The King Tree
1959 – Arthur G. Storey, Prairie Harvest
1960 – E. M. Granger Bennett, Short of the Glory

References

1942 establishments in Ontario
1960 disestablishments in Ontario
Awards disestablished in 1960
Awards established in 1942
Canadian fiction awards